Red Garland Revisited! is an album by pianist Red Garland featuring tracks recorded in 1957 which were first released on the Prestige label in 1969.

Reception

In his review for AllMusic, Scott Yanow called it "Predictably excellent music".

Track listing
 "Billy Boy" (Traditional) – 6:20     
 "Everybody's Somebody's Fool" (Ace Adams, Lionel Hampton) – 7:57     
 "Four" (Miles Davis) – 5:17     
 "You Keep Coming Back Like a Song" (Irving Berlin) – 5:35     
 "Hey Now" (Red Garland) – 3:45     
 "(I'm Afraid) The Masquerade Is Over" (Herb Magidson, Allie Wrubel) – 8:45     
 "Walkin'" (Richard Carpenter) – 7:08     
 "It Could Happen to You" (Johnny Burke, Jimmy Van Heusen) – 5:44

Personnel
Red Garland – piano
Kenny Burrell – guitar (tracks 3 & 7)
Paul Chambers – bass 
Art Taylor – drums

References 

Prestige Records albums
Red Garland albums
1969 albums
Albums recorded at Van Gelder Studio
Albums produced by Bob Weinstock